was a Japanese politician of the Liberal Democratic Party, a member of the House of Representatives in the Diet (national legislature). A native of Fujisawa, Kanagawa and graduate of Nihon University, he was elected to the House of Representatives for the first time in 1996 after serving in the city assembly of Fujisawa for four terms. He lost his seat in 2000 but was re-elected three years later.

References

External links 
  in Japanese

1944 births
2013 deaths
People from Fujisawa, Kanagawa
Nihon University alumni
Members of the House of Representatives (Japan)
Liberal Democratic Party (Japan) politicians
21st-century Japanese politicians
Japanese municipal councilors
Politicians from Kanagawa Prefecture